The 1996 Memorial Cup occurred May 11–19 at the Peterborough Memorial Centre in Peterborough, Ontario.  It was the 78th annual Memorial Cup competition and determined the major junior ice hockey champion of the Canadian Hockey League (CHL).  Participating teams were the host Peterborough Petes, who were also the champions of the Ontario Hockey League, as well as the OHL runner-up Guelph Storm, and the winners of the Quebec Major Junior Hockey League and Western Hockey League, which were the Granby Prédateurs and the Brandon Wheat Kings.  Granby won their first Memorial Cup, over Peterborough. It was the first time since 1971 that a team from the province of Quebec won the Cup.

Granby faced the Peterborough Petes for the cup — on Peterborough ice. Inside the old arena, it climbed to a stifling 27 C during play, and fog rising from the ice made it hard for players to see. Maintenance crews came often to remove pooling water. Granby still managed a 4–0 victory, which brought the cup back to Quebec for the first time since 1971.

Round-robin standings

Scores
Round-robin
May 11 Granby 8-0 Guelph
May 12 Brandon 2-1 Guelph
May 12 Peterborough 6-3 Granby
May 14 Brandon 3-2 Peterborough (OT)
May 15 Granby 3-1 Brandon
May 16 Peterborough 2-1 Guelph

Semi-final
May 18 Peterborough 4-3 Brandon

Final
May 19 Granby 4-0 Peterborough

Winning roster

Award winners
Stafford Smythe Memorial Trophy (MVP): Cameron Mann, Peterborough
George Parsons Trophy (Sportsmanship): Mike Williams, Peterborough
Hap Emms Memorial Trophy (Goaltender): Frederic Deschenes, Granby
Ed Chynoweth Trophy (Top Scorer): Philippe Audet, Granby

All-star team
Goal: Frederic Deschenes, Granby
Defence: Wade Redden, Brandon; Jason Doig, Granby
Centre: Xavier Delisle, Granby
Left wing: Philippe Audet, Granby
Right wing: Cameron Mann, Peterborough

References

External links
 Memorial Cup 
 Canadian Hockey League
Mastercardmemorialcup.ca Video
Sportsline Toronto video

Memorial Cup 1996
Memorial Cup 1996
Sport in Peterborough, Ontario